In molecular biology, the dipeptidyl-peptidase IV family is a family of serine peptidases which belong to MEROPS peptidase family S9 (clan SC), subfamily S9B (dipeptidyl-peptidase IV). The protein fold of the peptidase domain for members of this family resembles that of serine carboxypeptidase D, the type example of clan SC. The type example of this family is Dipeptidyl peptidase-4.

Human proteins in this family are:
Dipeptidyl peptidase-4
Dipeptidyl peptidase 8
Dipeptidyl peptidase 9
Inactive dipeptidyl peptidase 10
Dipeptidyl aminopeptidase-like protein 6
Seprase

External links 
MEROPS entry for family S9B

References 

Protein families